Western Communications, Inc. was an American newspaper publisher serving the states of Oregon and California. The family-owned company was based in Bend, Oregon and was founded by Robert W. Chandler. Its flagship paper was The Bulletin.

Chandler, who bought the Bulletin in 1953, built the company up over the ensuing decades, prior to his death in 1996. The company was recognized by an Oregon State University awards program in 1995, for an effective ownership transition from Chandler to his daughter, Elizabeth McCool, and for remaining actively engaged in its community. At the time, the chain consisted of eight papers and employed 300 people. When the company bought The Redmond Spokesman from Mary Brown in 1955, it owned radio stations in Oregon and California.

The company built a large headquarters building in Bend in 2000. It filed for Chapter 11 bankruptcy in 2011, seeking to renegotiate an $18 million loan, and hoping to complete the bankruptcy proceedings within six months. In 2012, the company did emerge from bankruptcy, but also laid off 10% of its staff, due to a sharp decline in advertising revenue from legal notices. In 2017, it listed its headquarters building for sale, but no offer had been accepted as of January 2019, and the company had fallen behind on payments of state taxes. The debt the company owes is estimated at $26 million. In January 2019, the company again filed for bankruptcy protection. Two papers were sold to Country Media, one was sold to RISN Operations and the remaining properties were sold to EO Media Group.

Newspapers
Oregon
 Baker City Herald
 The Bulletin, Bend
 Central Oregon Nickel Ads
 Curry Coastal Pilot, Brookings
 The Observer, La Grande
 The Redmond Spokesman
    
California
 The Daily Triplicate, Crescent City
 The Union Democrat, Sonora

References

External links
The Chandler Lecture from the University of Oregon School of Journalism and Communication

Companies based in Bend, Oregon
Newspaper companies of the United States
Privately held companies based in Oregon
Publishing companies based in Oregon